The narrow-headed slender opossum (Marmosops cracens) is a species of opossum in the family Didelphidae. It is endemic to Venezuela.

References

Opossums
Mammals of Venezuela
Endemic fauna of Venezuela
Mammals described in 1979
Taxonomy articles created by Polbot